Stoidis is a genus of jumping spiders that was first described by Eugène Louis Simon in 1901.  it contains only two species, found only in Venezuela and on the Windward Islands: S. pygmaea and S. squamulosa.

References

Salticidae genera
Salticidae
Spiders of South America
Spiders of the Caribbean